The Fatalist is a 2005 Portuguese-French drama film written and directed by João Botelho. It is based on  Denis Diderot's novel Jacques the Fatalist. It was entered into the main competition at the 62nd edition of the Venice Film Festival.

Plot

Cast   
  
 Rogério Samora  as Tiago 
 Rita Blanco as Senhora D. 
  Suzana Borges as Estalajadeira 
  Patrícia Guerreiro as Bárbara 
 José Wallenstein as Marquis
 Teresa Madruga as  Bárbara's mother  
 Margarida Vila-Nova as  the daughter 
  Maria Emilia Correia as  the landlady 
 Adriano Luz as  the husband 
  João Baptista as Tiago (aged 20)
 Helena Laureano as  Miss  Suzete 
 Ana Bustorff as  Miss Margarida 
 Laura Soveral  as  Tiago's grandmother

References

External links  

 

2005 drama films
2005 films
Brazilian drama films
Denis Diderot
French drama films
Films directed by João Botelho
Films produced by Paulo Branco
Films based on French novels
2000s Portuguese-language films
2000s French films